Bhati is a social group of India and Pakistan.

Bhati may also refer to:

Places 
 Bhati (region), a region of medieval Bengal
 Bhati, Delhi, a census town in India
 Bhati, Maharashtra, a village in India
 Bhati dynasty, a medieval dynasty which ruled Jaisalmer in India

People with the name 
 Ajaib Singh Bhatti (born 1951), Indian politician of Punjab
 Arjun Bhati (born 2004), Indian golfer
 Chiman Singh Bhati (died 1975), Indian politician of Rajasthan
 Dargahi Singh Bhati (died 1828), Indian landowner
 Devi Singh Bhati (born 1946), Indian politician of Rajasthan
 Hridayeshwar Singh Bhati (born 2002), Indian chess innovator
 Narayan Singh Bhati (1930–2004), Indian writer
 Narendra Bhati (born 1958), Indian politician of Uttar Pradesh
 Prayag Bhati (born 1991), Indian cricketer playing for Maharashtra
 Suboth Bhati (born 1990), Indian cricketer playing for Delhi
 Umrao Singh Bhati (died 1857), Indian revolutionary
 Varun Singh Bhati (born 1995), Indian para high jumper
 Vedram Bhati (born 1951), Indian politician of Uttar Pradesh